A flatshare is an arrangement in which two or more people share a flat (apartment).

Flatshare may also refer to:

The Flatshare (TV series), 2022 comedy-drama series based on a novel of the same name.